Rolf Magnus Krepper (born 10 January 1967 in Norrköping, Sweden) is a Swedish actor, dancer, singer, and magician. He is a member of Moderna Illusionisters Cirkel.

In 2006, Krepper received the Guldbagge Award for best male role in the 2005 film Mun mot mun.

Selected filmography

1994: Rena rama Rolf (TV Series) - Filip
1998: När karusellerna sover (TV Series) - Trollkarlen Igor Johansson
1999: Vägen ut - Holmlund
1999: Anna Holt – polis (TV Series) - Pikétchefen
2000: Det grovmaskiga nätet (TV Mini Series) - Våldsam patient
2001: Familjehemligheter - Kjell's Father
2001: As White as in Snow - Polish Artist
2002: Beck (TV Series) - Bengt Tavast
2002: Det brinner! (TV Mini Series) - Lasse
2003: Lejontämjaren - Björn Sundström
2003: Sprickorna i muren - Lars Herdin
2003: Misa mi - Pappa
2003: Om jag vänder mig om - Anders
2003: De drabbade (TV Mini Series) - Åke
2003–2007: Tusenbröder (TV Series) - Patrik
2004: Tre solan - Budbäraren
2004: Kniven i hjärtat (TV Mini Series)
2005: Mun mot mun - Morgan / Vera's pimp
2006: Tusenbröder – Återkomsten - Patrik
2008: Goda råd (Short) - Mats
2009: Oskyldigt dömd (TV Series) - Thomas Hjelte
2009: The Girl Who Played with Fire - Hans Faste
2009: The Girl Who Kicked the Hornets' Nest - Hans Faste
2010: Kommissarie Winter (TV Series) - Erik Winter
2010–2019: Solsidan (TV Series) - Palle
2010: Ond tro - Kommissarien
2011: Room 304 - Jonas
2011: Iris - Bruno
2011: Tatort (TV Series) - Stefan Enberg
2011: The Bridge (TV Series) - Stefan
2012:  En plats i solen - Niklas Linde
2012: Call Girl - Statsministern
2013: Irl - Pappa Stefan
2013: Cayuco - Thomas
2014: Gentlemen - Stene Forman
2015: The Paradise Suite - Stig
2015–2016: Ditte & Louise (TV Series) - Erik
2016: All the Beauty - David 51
2016: The Red Trees (Short) - Alexander Lars Levín
2016: Devil's Bride - Nils Psilander
2016: A Cure for Wellness - Pieter the Vet
2017: Anchors Up - Grabben (voice)
2017–2019: Before We Die (TV Series) - Björn
2018: Liberty (TV Mini Series) - Jonas
2018: Becoming Astrid - Samuel
2018: Before the Frost - Art
2018: Før frosten - Gustav
2019: Queen of Hearts - Peter
2019: Undtagelsen - Gunnar
2021: Margrete den første - Johan Sparre
2021: JJ+E - Frank
2021: Deserted
2021: Love Gets a Room - Sergeant Szkop
2021: Fenris, 1 season - Marius Stenhammar

References

External links
http://www.sfi.se/sv/svensk-filmdatabas/Item/?type=PERSON&itemid=251299

Living people
1967 births
Swedish male film actors
Swedish magicians
Swedish male singers
Swedish male dancers
People from Norrköping
Best Supporting Actor Guldbagge Award winners
Swedish male television actors
20th-century Swedish dancers
20th-century Swedish male actors
21st-century Swedish dancers
21st-century Swedish male actors